Aleksandr Semenovich Stishinsky (June 18, 1851,  Tiflis – December 29, 1920, Constantinople) was a Russian statesman and nationalist politician.

Biography
Graduate of Moscow University (1872). Worked in the Department for General Affairs of the Ministry of the Interior ; transferred to the Imperial Chancellery (1873); Assistant State Secretary (1882–1886), then again transferred to the Ministry of the Interior; Head of the Peasant Section (1893); Assistant Imperial Secretary (1896–1899). Assistant Minister of the Interior (1900–1904). Member of State Council (1904), belonged to its right-wing group.

Head of the Chief Administration of Land Organization and Agriculture in the Goremykin cabinet (April — June 1906).

Chairman of the Committee to Fight German Domination [in Russia] (1916).

He was arrested during the February revolution and imprisoned for 9 months in Peter and Paul Fortress. Released in December 1917, he fled to Poltava, then to Kuban. He died in Constantinople in 1920.

Sources
V.I. Gurko. Features And Figures Of The Past. Government And Opinion In The Reign Of Nicholas II.

1851 births
1920 deaths
Politicians from Tbilisi
People from Tiflis Governorate
Members of the State Council (Russian Empire)
Politicians of the Russian Empire
Members of the Russian Assembly
Members of the Union of the Russian People
Moscow State University alumni
Russian nationalists